Torhild Aarbergsbotten (born 6 December 1969) is a Norwegian politician for the Conservative Party.

She served as a deputy representative to the Parliament of Norway from Sør-Trøndelag during the terms 2009–2013 and 2013–2017. She hails from Sande, Sogn og Fjordane, but resides in Ørland and has been a member of Ørland municipal council and Sør-Trøndelag county council.

References

1969 births
Living people
People from Gaular
People from Ørland
Deputy members of the Storting
Conservative Party (Norway) politicians
Sør-Trøndelag politicians
Women members of the Storting
21st-century Norwegian politicians
21st-century Norwegian women politicians